Jean Matter Mandler (born 1929) is Distinguished Research Professor of Cognitive Science at the University of California, San Diego and visiting professor at University College London.

She was born in Oak Park, Illinois, in 1929 and attended Carleton College before transferring to Swarthmore College, where she graduated summa cum laude in 1951. She received her Ph.D. in psychology at Harvard University in 1956. After a series of research positions – common for women in the 1950–1960s – at Harvard, the University of Toronto, and at UCSD, she became an associate professor at UCSD in 1973 and professor in 1977; she retired as a research professor in 2000. In 1986 she was one of the founding members of the Department of Cognitive Science.

Research

Mandler's early research was on animal learning and in the 1960s she worked on textual analysis, including the development of a widely used story grammar. Starting in the 1970s she turned to developmental problems with special emphasis on early conceptual development which culminated in her influential book on the foundations of mind. In 2006 the book received the "Eleanor Maccoby Outstanding Book Award" from the Division of Developmental Psychology, APA, and in 2007 the "Best Authored Book Award" from the Cognitive Development Society. In 2007 she was also given the American Psychological Association's "Distinguished Scientific Contribution Award".

Mandler is a Fellow of the American Academy of Arts and Sciences and of the Society of Experimental Psychologists. She has been active on the editorial board of several developmental journals.

Books by Jean Mandler
 Mandler, J. M., & Mandler, G. (1964). Thinking: From Association to Gestalt. New York: Wiley.
 Mandler, J. M. (1984). Stories, scripts, and scenes: Aspects of schema theory. Hillsdale, NJ: Lawrence Erlbaum Associates.
 Mandler, J. M. (2004). The foundations of mind: The origins of conceptual thought. New York: Oxford University Press.

References 

 Carey, S. (2000) The origin of concepts. Journal of Cognition and Development, 1, 37–41.
 Stein, N. L., Bauer, P. and Rabinowitz, M. (2002) Representation, memory and development: Essays in honor of Jean Mandler. Mahwah, NJ: Lawrence Erlbaum Associates.
 APA award citation
 Reznick, J.S. & Bauer, P. J. Constructing a Mind, One Image Schema at a Time. Journal of Cognition and Development, 9, 253–255.

External links
Jean Mandler's home page

University of California, San Diego faculty
21st-century American psychologists
American women psychologists
University of California, San Diego alumni
Scientists from Oak Park, Illinois
Carleton College alumni
Swarthmore College alumni
Harvard University alumni
1929 births
Living people
Fellows of the Cognitive Science Society
21st-century American women
20th-century American psychologists